Hugh McGary Jr. was the founder of Evansville, Indiana.

The Founding of Evansville, Indiana
On March 27, 1812, Hugh McGary Jr. purchased about 441 acres and named it "McGary's Landing". In 1814, to attract more people, McGary renamed his village "Evansville" in honor of Colonel Robert Morgan Evans. Evansville incorporated in 1817 and became a county seat on January 7, 1818.

References

1778 births
Year of death missing
American city founders
People from Evansville, Indiana